The 1996 Miami Hurricanes football team represented the University of Miami during the 1996 NCAA Division I-A football season. It was the Hurricanes' 71st season of football and sixth as a member of the Big East Conference. The Hurricanes were led by second-year head coach Butch Davis and played their home games at the Orange Bowl. They finished the season 9–3 overall and 6–1 in the Big East to finish as conference co-champion. They were invited to the Carquest Bowl where they defeated Virginia, 31–21.

Schedule

Personnel

Coaching staff

Support staff

Roster

Statistics

Passing

Rushing

Receiving

References

Miami
Miami Hurricanes football seasons
Cheez-It Bowl champion seasons
Miami Hurricanes football